In graph theory, an expander graph is a sparse graph that has strong connectivity properties, quantified using vertex, edge or spectral expansion. Expander constructions have spawned research in pure and applied mathematics, with several applications to complexity theory, design of robust computer networks, and the theory of error-correcting codes.

Definitions
Intuitively, an expander graph is a finite, undirected multigraph in which every subset of the vertices that  is not "too large" has a "large" boundary. Different formalisations of these notions give rise to different notions of expanders: edge expanders, vertex expanders, and spectral expanders, as defined below.

A disconnected graph is not an expander, since the boundary of a connected component is empty. Every connected graph is an expander; however, different connected graphs have different expansion parameters. The complete graph has the best expansion property, but it has largest possible degree. Informally, a graph is a good expander if it has low degree and high expansion parameters.

Edge expansion
The edge expansion (also isoperimetric number or Cheeger constant)  of a graph  on  vertices is defined as
 
where 
 
the edges between the subsets of vertices .

Intuitively, 
 
is the minimum number of edges that need to be cut in order to split the graph in two.
The edge expansion normalizes this concept by dividing with smallest number of vertices among the two parts.
To see how the normalization can drastically change the value, consider the following example.
Take two complete graphs with the same number of vertices  and add  edges between the two graphs by connecting their vertices one-to-one.
The minimum cut will be  but the edge expansion will be 1.

If we want to write  with an optimization over all non-empty subsets, we can rewrite it as

Vertex expansion
The vertex isoperimetric number  (also vertex expansion or magnification) of a graph  is defined as
 

The vertex isoperimetric number  of a graph  is defined as
 

Spectral expansion
Because  is symmetric, the spectral theorem implies that  has  real-valued eigenvalues .

More formally, we refer to an -vertex, -regular graph with 
 
as an -graph.

If we set

where 
 
is the 2-norm of the vector .

The normalized versions of these definitions are also widely used and more convenient in stating some results. Here one considers the matrix , which is the Markov transition matrix of the graph . Its eigenvalues are between −1 and 1. For not necessarily regular graphs, the spectrum of a graph can be defined similarly using the eigenvalues of the Laplacian matrix. For directed graphs, one considers the singular values of the adjacency matrix , which are equal to the roots of the eigenvalues of the symmetric matrix .

Relationships between different expansion properties

The expansion parameters defined above are related to each other. In particular, for any -regular graph ,

Consequently, for constant degree graphs, vertex and edge expansion are qualitatively the same.

Cheeger inequalities
If  is connected, then . An inequality due to Dodziuk and independently Alon and Milman states that
 
In fact, the lower bound is tight.
 
These inequalities are closely related to the Cheeger bound for Markov chains and can be seen as a discrete version of Cheeger's inequality in Riemannian geometry.

Similar connections between vertex isoperimetric numbers and the spectral gap have also been studied:
 
 

Constructions
There are three general strategies for explicitly constructing families of expander graphs. The first strategy is algebraic and group-theoretic, the second strategy is analytic and uses additive combinatorics, and the third strategy is combinatorial and uses the zig-zag and related graph products. Noga Alon showed that certain graphs constructed from finite geometries are the sparsest examples of highly expanding graphs.

Margulis–Gabber–Galil
Algebraic constructions based on Cayley graphs are known for various variants of expander graphs. The following construction is due to Margulis and has been analysed by Gabber and Galil. For every natural number , one considers the graph  with the vertex set , where : For every vertex , its eight adjacent vertices are

Then the following holds:

Theorem. For all , the graph  has second-largest eigenvalue .

Ramanujan graphs

By a theorem of Alon and Boppana, all sufficiently large -regular graphs satisfy , where  is the second largest eigenvalue in absolute value. Ramanujan graphs are -regular graphs for which this bound is tight, satisfying  

This makes them excellent spectral expanders.

Lubotzky, Phillips, and Sarnak (1988), Margulis (1988), and Morgenstern (1994) show how Ramanujan graphs can be constructed explicitly.

In 1985, Alon, conjectured that most -regular graphs on  vertices, for sufficiently large , are almost Ramanujan.

.

In 2003, Joel Friedman both proved the conjecture and specified what is meant by "most -regular graphs" by showing that random -regular graphs have  for every  with probability , where

Zig-Zag product 

Reingold, Vadhan, and Wigderson introduced the zig-zag product in 2003. Roughly speaking, the zig-zag product of two expander graphs produces a graph with only slightly worse expansion. Therefore, a zig-zag product can also be used to construct families of expander graphs.

 .
Specifically,

Note that property (1) implies that the zig-zag product of two expander graphs is also an expander graph, thus zig-zag products can be used inductively to create a family of expander graphs.

Intuitively, the construction of the zig-zag product can be thought of in the following way.

Randomized constructions
There are many results that show the existence of graphs with good expansion properties through probabilistic arguments.

Applications and useful properties
The original motivation for expanders is to build economical robust networks (phone or computer): an expander with bounded degree is precisely an asymptotic robust graph with the number of edges growing linearly with size (number of vertices), for all subsets.

Expander graphs have found extensive applications in computer science, in designing algorithms, error correcting codes, extractors, pseudorandom generators, sorting networks and robust computer networks. They have also been used in proofs of many important results in computational complexity theory, such as SL = L and the PCP theorem. In cryptography, expander graphs are used to construct hash functions.

In a 2006 survey of expander graphs, Hoory, Linial, and Wigderson split the study of expander graphs into four categories: extremal problems, typical behavior, explicit constructions, and algorithms. Extremal problems focus on the bounding of expansion parameters, while typical behavior problems characterize how the expansion parameters are distributed over random graphs. Explicit constructions focus on constructing graphs that optimize certain parameters, and algorithmic questions study the evaluation and estimation of parameters.

Expander mixing lemma

The approximation is better the smaller  is.

If the two sets are not disjoint, edges in their intersection are counted twice, that is,

 

Then the expander mixing lemma says that the following inequality holds:

Many properties of -graphs are corollaries of the expander mixing lemmas, including the following.

 An independent set of a graph is a subset of vertices with no two vertices adjacent. In an -graph, an independent set has size at most .
Hoffman showed that , while Alon, Krivelevich, and Sudakov showed that if , then
 The diameter of a graph is the maximum distance between two vertices, where the distance between two vertices is defined to be the shortest path between them. Chung showed that the diameter of an -graph is at most

Expander walk sampling

The Chernoff bound states that, when sampling many independent samples from a random variables in the range , with high probability the average of our samples is close to the expectation of the random variable. This is particularly useful in the theory of derandomization, since sampling according to an expander walk uses many fewer random bits than sampling independently.

AKS sorting network and approximate halvers 

Sorting networks take a set of inputs and perform a series of parallel steps to sort the inputs. A parallel step consists of performing any number of disjoint comparisons and potentially swapping pairs of compared inputs. The depth of a network is given by the number of parallel steps it takes. Expander graphs play an important role in the AKS sorting network, which achieves depth . While this is asymptotically the best known depth for a sorting network, the reliance on expanders makes the constant bound too large for practical use.

Within the AKS sorting network, expander graphs are used to construct bounded depth -halvers.

Following , a depth  -halver can be constructed as follows.

The vertices of the graph can be thought of as registers that contain inputs and the edges can be thought of as wires that compare the inputs of two registers. The goal is to end with  roughly containing the smaller half of the inputs and  containing roughly the larger half of the inputs. To achieve this, sequentially process each matching by comparing the registers paired up by the edges of this matching and correct any inputs that are out of order. It is clear that this process consists of  parallel steps.

Furthermore, this property remains true throughout the rest of the process. This violates the previous property however, and thus the output sets   and  must be an -halving.

See also
Algebraic connectivity
Zig-zag product
Superstrong approximation
Spectral graph theory

Notes

References

Textbooks and surveys

Research articles
 
 
 
 .
 .
 .

Recent Applications

External links 
 Brief introduction in Notices of the American Mathematical Society
 Introductory paper by Michael Nielsen
 Lecture notes from a course on expanders (by Nati Linial and Avi Wigderson)
 Lecture notes from a course on expanders (by Prahladh Harsha)
Definition and application of spectral gap

Graph families